Countess Maria Theodora Paulina (Dora) Pejačević ( 10 September 1885 – 5 March 1923) was a Croatian composer and a member of the Pejačević noble family. She was one of the composers to introduce the orchestral song to Croatian music and her Symphony in F-sharp minor is considered by scholars to be the first modern symphony in Croatian music.

Early life
Dora Pejačević (in old documents also Pejacsevich) was born in Budapest, Kingdom of Hungary, the daughter of a Croatian ban, Hungarian-Croatian Count Teodor Pejačević of Virovitica and Hungarian Baroness Elisabeth Josepha  (1860–1941), herself a fine pianist. Her mother was the first to give her piano lessons. Paternally, she descended from the old Croatian noble Pejačević family, one of the most distinguished noble families in Slavonia, the eastern region of Croatia. Her maternal family was, for centuries intermarried with Counts Teleki de Szék, which gave them political and economical importance within the region of Budapest. Much of her mother’s prominence led to Dora veering towards music rather than the aristocratic lifestyle that was impressed upon her.

Pejačević began to compose when she was 12. She was largely self-taught, however.

Career and personal life
In 1913, Pejačević composed a piano concerto, her first orchestral work, marking her as the first ever Croatian composer to write a concerto. Pejačević’s earlier compositions mostly consisted of piano pieces, sonatas, and songs and were considered elite in their nature. Many of her pieces premiered in Germany, played by major soloists of the era. When her Symphony in F-sharp minor, Op. 41, premiered in the Great Hall of Vienna's Musikverein, a critic was surprised when a woman came up on stage, which shows how her excellence contributed to her importance as a composer, specifically a woman composer, in the early twentieth century. Throughout her lifetime, Pejačević's compositions were performed in Budapest, Vienna, Prague, München, Dresden, and her town of Nasice.

On 14 September 1921 she married Ottomar Otto, Ritter von Lumbe (1892–1978), son of Franz, Ritter von Lumbe (1848-1920), great-great son of Count Franz von Thun und Hohenstein (1786-1873) and his wife, Countess Theresia Anna Maria von Brühl. They didn't have children. Although Pejačević led a lonely life, she met many prominent musicians and writers, and befriended Austrian journalist and writer Karl Kraus and Czech aristocrat and patroness of arts, Countess Sidonie von Thun und Hohenstein.

Death
Pejačević died in Munich in 1923. Multiple sources have described her passing in contradicting manners. One source claims the cause of Pejačević's death was kidney failure, taking place four weeks after her son, Theo's birth. Another source mentions her passing taking place as a result from complications during childbirth. Her tombstone, per her request, has her name written solely as “Dora” with the short phrase "Rest Now". She is buried at the cemetery in Našice, Croatia.

Legacy
Pejačević is considered a major Croatian composer. She left behind a considerable catalogue of 58 opuses (106 compositions), mostly in late Romantic style, including songs, piano works, chamber music, and several compositions for large orchestra, arguably her best. Her Symphony in F-sharp minor is considered by scholars the first modern symphony in Croatian music. Most of her music has yet to be published and released on compact disc, although concerted efforts have been made recently to rectify this situation. For example, the Croatian Music Information Centre has published some of her scores, including three of her orchestral works (Piano Concerto, Symphony, and Phantasie Concertante). In 2008, the Center also published a bilingual monograph (in English and Croatian), written by the Pejačević scholar Koraljka Kos, accompanied by a first all-Pejačević CD of piano and chamber music.

Her life is the subject of the fictionalized Croatian biographical film Countess Dora (1993), directed by Zvonimir Berković and starring Alma Prica and Rade Šerbedžija.

List of works

Vocal compositions
Lieder
 "Ein Lied", Op. 11 (text: Paul Wilhelm; 1900)
 "Warum?", Op. 13 (text: Dora Pejačević; 1901)
 "Ave Maria", Op. 16, for voice, violin and organ, (1903)
 Sieben Lieder, Op. 23 (1907; dedicated to Eva van Osten, Melanie Páiffy-Almásy, Julia Culp)
 "Sicheres Merkmal"
 "Es hat gleich einem Diebe"
 "Taut erst Blauveilchen"
 "Es jagen sich Mond und Sonne"
 "Du bist der helle Frühlingsmorgen"
 "In den Blättern wühlt"
 "Es war einmal"
 Zwei Lieder, Op. 27 (Text: Wilhelmine von Wickenburg-Almasy; Ernst Strauss; 1909)
 "Ich schleiche meine Straßen"
 "Verweht"
 Vier Lieder, Op. 30 (Text: Anna Ritter; 1911; dedicated to Marianne Konradsheim)
 "Ein Schrei"
 "Wie ein Rausch"
 "Ich glaub', lieber Schatz"
 "Traumglück"
 Verwandlung for voice, violin and organ, Op. 37a (text: Karl Kraus; 1915; dedicated to Sidonie Nádherny von Borutin)
 Mädchengestalten, Op. 42 (text: Rainer Maria Rilke 1916)
 "Als du mich einst gefunden hast"
 "Viel Fähren sind auf den Flüssen"
 "Ich bin eine Waise"
 "Ich war ein Kind und träumte viel"
 "An eine Falte", Op. 46 (text: Karl Kraus; 1918; dedicated to Sidonie Nádherny von Borutin)
 Drei Gesänge, Op. 53 (text: Friedrich Nietzsche; 1919–1920)
 "Venedig"
 "Vereinsamt"
 "Der Einsamste"
 Zwei Lieder, Op. 55 (Text: Karl Henckell; Ricarda Huch; 1920; dedicated to Rosa Lumbe-Mladota and Juza Lumbe)
 "Zu dir!"
 "Um bei dir zu sein"
 Tri dječje pjesme (Three children's songs), Op. 56 (text: Zmaj Jovan Jovanović; 1921)
 "Majčica, moj anđeo" (Mommy, my angel)
 "Dijete i baka" (Child and grandmother)
 "Mali Radojica" (Little Radojica)

With orchestral accompaniment
 Verwandlung, Op. 37b (text: Karl Kraus; 1915)
 Liebeslied, Op. 39 (text: Rainer Maria Rilke; 1915)
 Zwei Schmetterlingslieder, Op. 52 (text: Karl Henckell; 1920)
 "Goldne Sterne, blaue Glöckchen"
 "Schwebe, du Schmetterling"

Compositions for solo piano
 Berceuse, Op. 2 (1897)
 Gondellied, Op. 4 (In Erinnerung an die gemütlichen Tage in Našice von Dora, Našice, 25 July 1898)
 Chanson sans paroles, Op. 5, (1898)
 Papillon, Op. 6 (1898)
 Menuette, Op. 7 (1898)
 Impromptu, Op. 9a (1899)
 Chanson sans paroles, Op. 10 (1900; dedicated to baroness Else Szentkereszty)
 Albumblatt, Op. 12 (1901; lost)
 Trauermarsch, Op. 14 (1902)
 Sechs Phantasiestücke, Op. 17 (1903)
 "Sehnsucht"
 "Leid"
 "Frage"
 "Klage"
 "Bitte"
 "Wahn" (2 versions: A and B)
 Blumenleben – acht Klavierstücke nach der Blütenzeit im Jahresablauf komponiert, Op. 19 (1904–1905)
 "Schneeglöckchen"
 "Veilchen"
 "Maiglöckchen"
 "Vergißmeinnicht"
 "Rose"
 "Rote Nelken"
 "Lilien"
 "Chrysanthemen"
 Berceuse, Op. 20 (1906; dedicated to her nephew, Count Nikola Pejačević)
 Valse de concert, Op. 21 (1906)
 Erinnerung, Op. 24 (1908; dedicated to Marie Therese Schall-Riaucour)
 Walzer-Capricen, Op. 28 (1910; dedicated to her professor Percy Sherwood)
 "Moderato"
 "Grazioso"
 "Im Laendler-tempo"
 "Wiegend"
 "Lento"
 "Tempo giusto"
 "Allegretto"
 "Grazioso, allegramente"
 "Moderato"
 Vier Klavierstücke, Op. 32a (1912; dedicated to pianist Alice Ripper, who premiered them in Stockholm in 1917)
 (lost)
 "Libelle"
 "Papillon"
 "Abendgedanke"
 Vertige, Valse-Boston, (May 24, 1906; Romantic Salon Style)
Impromptu, Op. 32b (1912; dedicated to pianist Alice Ripper)
 Sonata in B-flat minor, Op. 36 (1914; dedicated to Anny von Lange)
 "Con fuoco non troppo allegro"
 "Andante con molta espressione"
 "Allegro risoluto"
 Zwei Intermezzi, Op. 38 (1915; dedicated to Olga Schulz-Granitz)
 "Ruhig und innig"
 "Langsam und ausdrucksvoll"
 Zwei Klavierskizzen, Op. 44 (1918; dedicated to Anny von Lange)
 "An dich!"
 "Vor deinem Bild"
 Blütenwirbel, Op. 45 (1918; 2 versions: A and B; dedicated to Sidonie Nádherny von Borutin)
 Capriccio, Op. 47 (1919; dedicated to pianist Alice Ripper)
 Zwei Nocturnos, Op. 50 (1918; 1920)
 "Sehr ruhig, mit innigem Ausdruck" (Janowitz 20–21 Juli 1918; dedicated to pianist Alice Ripper)
 "Leicht bewegt und ferträumt"
 Humoreske und Caprice, Op. 54 (1920)
 "Humoreske", allegretto vivo
 "Caprice", vivace grazioso
 Sonata in A-flat major, Op. 57 (in one movement; 1921)

Chamber compositions
 Rêverie for violin and piano, Op. 3 (1897)
 Canzonetta in D major, for violin and piano, Op. 8 (1899; her first printed composition; dedicated to Stefi Geyer)
 Impromptu, for piano quartet, Op. 9b (1903; arrangement of Op. 9a)
 Trio in D major, Op. 15 for violin, cello and piano (1902)
 Menuett in A major, Op. 18, for violin and piano (1904; dedicated to Jaroslav Kocian)
 Romanze in F major, Op. 22, for violin and piano (1907)
 Quartet in D minor, Op. 25 for violin, viola, cello and piano (1908)
 Sonata in D major, Frühlings-Sonate, Op. 26 for violin and piano (1909)
 Trio in C major, Op. 29 for violin, cello and piano (1910)
 String Quartet in F major, Op. 31 (1911; lost)
 Elegie in E-flat major for violin and piano, Op. 34 (1913; dedicated to Johannes Nádherny-Borutin)
 Sonata in E minor, Op. 35 for cello and piano (1913; dedicated to Olga and Ernst Schulz)
 Piano Quintet in B minor, Op. 40 for 2 violins, viola, violoncello and piano, (1915–1918)
 Sonata in B minor Slawische Sonate for violin and piano, Op. 43 (1917; dedicated to violinist Zlatko Baloković)
 Méditation for violin and piano, Op. 51 (1919; dedicated to Viteszlav Novák)
 String Quartet in C major, Op. 58 (1922)

Orchestral compositions
 Piano Concerto in G minor, Op. 33 (1913)
 Symphony in F-sharp minor for large orchestra, Op. 41 (1916 – 1917, rev. 1920; dedicated to her mother baroness Lilla Vay de Vaya)
 Phantasie concertante in D minor for piano and orchestra, Op. 48 (1919; dedicated to pianist Alice Ripper)
 Ouverture in D minor for large orchestra, Op. 49 (1919)

Songs for voice and orchestra (1915–1920)
 Verwandlung for voice, violin and orchestra, Op. 37b (text: Karl Kraus)
 Liebeslied, Op. 39, (text: Rainer Maria Rilke; dedicated to her sister Gabrielle Kochanovsky)
 Zwei Schmetterlingslieder, Op. 52 (text: Karl Henckell)
 No. 1, "Gold'ne Sterne, blaue Glöckchen"
 No. 2, "Schwebe du Schmetterling, schwebe vorbei"

Recordings
 Symphony in F-sharp minor, Op. 41; Phantasie Concertante in D minor, Op. 48 for Piano & Orchestra (CPO CD#777-418-2)
 Piano Trio, Op. 29; Cello Sonata, Op. 35 (Oliver Triendl, Andrej Bielow, Christian Poltera. CPO 777-419-2)
 Piano Quintet, op.40; Piano Quartet, Op. 25; String Quartet, Op. 58; Impromptu, Op. 9 (Oliver Triendl, Quatuor Sine Nomine. CPO 777-421-2) [2 CDs]
 String Quartet in C major, Op. 58 together with String Sextet by Boris Papandopulo (CD #5558910)
 Violin Sonata No.1 in D major, Op. 26 together with works by Kunc, Boris Papandopulo and J. Š. Slavenski (CD #5872221)
 Lieder, Ein Lied, Op. 11; Warum, Op. 13; 7 Lieder, Op. 23; 2 Lieder, Op. 27; 4 Lieder, Op. 30; Verwandlung, Op. 37; Liebeslied, Op. 39; Mädchengestalten, Op. 42; An eine Falte, Op. 46; 2 Schmetterlingslieder, Op. 52; 3 Gesänge, Op. 53; 2 Lieder, Op. 55 (Ingeborg Danz, Cord Garben. CPO 777 422-2 (2012)
 Vertige, Valse-Boston (20th Century Foxtrots Volume 3. Catalogue Number GP854)
 Piano Concerto, Op. 33; Symphony, Op. 41; Peter Donohoe (piano), BBC Symphony Orchestra, conducted by Sakari Oramo, Chandos CHSA 5299 (2022)

In popular culture
In the Croatian pseudo-biographical film Countess Dora (1993) she is portrayed by Alma Prica.
Dora, the Croatian national selection for the Eurovision Song Contest bears the name of the composer Dora Pejačević.

References

Bibliography
 Kos, Koraljka. Dora Pejačević. Zagreb: The Croatian Music Information Centre, 2008.
 Kos, Koraljka. Dora Pejačević: Leben und Werk''. Zagreb: Musikinformationszentrum Konzertdirektion, 1987.
 Blevins, Pamela. "An Introduction to Croatian Composer Dora Pejačević". The Maud Powell Society
 "Ethel, Dora, & A Gent Named Ludwig". Piano By Nature, 18 April 2021
 "Dora Pejačević". Zentrum für Kunst Und Medien

External links
 
 The composer's official website hosted by the Croatian Music Information Centre

Dora
1885 births
1923 deaths
19th-century Croatian people
20th-century Croatian people
20th-century Hungarian people
Austro-Hungarian people
20th-century classical composers
Croatian composers
People from Slavonia
Women classical composers
Romantic composers
Croatian nobility
Hungarian nobility
Croatian Austro-Hungarians
Hungarian people of Croatian descent
Croatian people of Hungarian descent
German people of Croatian descent
Musicians from Budapest
Deaths in childbirth
19th-century women composers
20th-century women composers
19th-century Croatian nobility
20th-century Croatian nobility